Angel González-Román born in San Sebastián, Puerto Rico is a Puerto Rican jurist who served as Dean of the Pontifical Catholic University of Puerto Rico School of Law in Ponce, Puerto Rico.

Dean González-Román was appointed by Governor Rafael Hernández Colón, first as a Superior Court judge and, subsequently, as an appellate judge.  After retiring from  the bench, he was chosen as Dean of one of Puerto Rico's four law schools.

In 1968 he received a Juris Doctor degree at the Interamerican University of Puerto Rico School of Law.

Worked was in the highway authority since 1969, where he served as Legal office Director. Since 1974 he worked as a property registrar, where he served for 13 years and served as internal administrative Director. In 1987 he was appointed Superior judge, and subsequently stood as Judge of the Court of Appeals from 1992 to 2001. He also served as a member of the Panel of judges of the Office of the Independent prosecutor between the years 2002-2004. From 1981 to 2001 he served as Associate professor at the Polytechnic University of Puerto Rico. Starting in August 2004 he worked as the Dean of the Law School of the Pontifical Catholic University of Puerto Rico and imparted courses in labor law and collective bargaining.

In 2010, he was the editor of a book that contains excerpts of 61 of retired Puerto Rico Supreme Court Associate Justice Baltasar Corrada del Rio opinions on the Court.  He is the author of several law review and law journal articles.

References

People from San Sebastián, Puerto Rico
Puerto Rican lawyers
Deans of law schools in the United States
Living people
Year of birth missing (living people)
Puerto Rican judges
Interamerican University of Puerto Rico alumni